Mundra Airport  is a private airport in Mundra, Kutch, Gujarat, India owned by Mundra International Airport Private Ltd (MIAPL), a subsidiary of the Adani Group. The airstrip is spread over 45 hectares and is used for scheduled as well as non-scheduled operations.

The 1,900-metre long airstrip was built as part of the Mundra Special Economic Zone for operation of executive jets in January 2007.

In October 2017, the Adani Group announced plans to develop the airstrip into a commercial international airport for passenger, cargo and Maintenance spread over 522 hectares by investing  1500 crore. The terminal building will have a capacity of 300 passengers. The runway will be capable of handling of large aircraft like the Boeing 747 and will have night landing facilities. They have received environment clearance. It will be  commissioned by 2022.

Under UDAN Regional Connectivity Scheme, Air Odisha started flights between Ahmedabad and Mundra in February 2018.

Airlines and destinations

References

Airports in Gujarat
Kutch district
Adani Group
Airports established in 2007
2007 establishments in Gujarat